William Griffith 'Bill' Dovey QC (1924 – 1990) was a judge of the Family Court of Australia from 1976 to 1989. Alongside his extensive career specializing as a Sydney barrister and later as a judge in family law, he was a member of the Royal Australian Naval Volunteer Reserve. 

He was the son of Supreme Court of New South Wales judge Bill Dovey. His sister Margaret married the future Prime Minister of Australia, Gough Whitlam.

Dovey married Susan Fane De Salis, great granddaughter of famed pastoralist and politician Leopold De Salis. They had two daughters, Fane and Gillian.

References

Sources 
 Bill Dovey
 
 

Judges of the Family Court of Australia
1924 births
1990 deaths
Australian King's Counsel
Lawyers from Sydney